Judith Barker (born 22 June 1943) is an English actress, best known for her role in Coronation Street as the upwardly mobile homewrecker Janet Reid, which she played between 1969 and 1977. She has been married to Kenneth Alan Taylor since 1964.

Since her departure from Coronation Street, Barker has mostly been a character actress in television dramas, such as the 1984 Channel 4 series Scully in which she played the teacher Mrs Heath, an exception being her role in Brookside, playing the role of Audrey Manners during 1995. She appeared in the first series of Waterloo Road as Estelle Cooper, and had a small role in the film Miss Potter. It was reported that she declined the premiere for the movie with Renee Zellweger to teach drama at her local school, Saddleworth Drama Centre in Oldham.

Barker reappeared in Waterloo Road in series 10, playing a different character, Grace.

In 2012, she appeared in the second series of Scott & Bailey as Dorothy Parsons, the mother of Lesley Sharp's character DC Janet Scott. From 2019 to 2020, she appeared as Agatha Finn in Emmerdale. Barker also runs her own drama classes at Springhead Congregational Church, along with choreographer Adele Parry and musical director Dave Bintley. - Saddleworth Drama Centre. Recent achievements have seen her classes performing at the Oldham Coliseum Theatre.

Filmography

References

External links

 Judith Barker profile

1943 births
Living people
Actresses from Oldham
English soap opera actresses
English television actresses
20th-century English actresses
21st-century English actresses
English film actresses
English stage actresses